Jo Su-Huk (born March 18, 1987) is a South Korean footballer who currently plays for Ulsan Hyundai.

International career 
He played for South Korea national under-20 football team at the 2006 AFC Youth Championship and at the 2007 FIFA U-20 World Cup.

Club career statistics

Honours 
Ulsan Hyundai
AFC Champions League: 2020
K League 1: 2022

References

External links
 

1987 births
Living people
Association football goalkeepers
South Korean footballers
FC Seoul players
Incheon United FC players
Ulsan Hyundai FC players
K League 1 players
Konkuk University alumni